Frang Bardhi (Latin: Franciscus Blancus, 1606–1643) was an Albanian Catholic bishop and writer. Bardhi is best known as an author of the early eras of Albanian literature. He served as Bishop of Sapë (1635–1644).

Life
Bardhi was born in Kallmet or Nënshat in the northern Albanian Zadrima region near Lezhë. He came from a family consisting of many figures high in the hierarchy of the Catholic Church and state officials or military commanders of the Republic of Venice. His uncle was Bishop of Sapa and Sarda. He studied theology in Italy. On 17 December 1635, Francesco Bianchi was appointed during the papacy of Pope Urban VIII as Bishop of Sapë. On 30 March 1636, he was consecrated bishop by Ciriaco Rocci, Cardinal-Priest of San Salvatore in Lauro, with Giovanni Battista Altieri, Bishop Emeritus of Camerino, and Ottavio Broglia, Bishop of Asti, serving as co-consecrators.

Bardhi is remembered as the author of the first Albanian dictionary Dictionarium latino-epiroticum (Latin-Albanian dictionary) published in Rome in 1635, comprising 5,640 entries. Its appendix contains a list of 113 proverbs, phrases, and idioms, some of which are translations from other languages into Albanian with the vast majority being collected from the Albanian folklore.

Bardhi also wrote a biography of George Kastrioti Skanderbeg, called The Apology of Scanderbeg published in Venice in 1636. The Apology of Scanderbeg was a polemic against Slavic Catholic priest Ivan Tomko Mrnavić, who claimed that Kastrioti was of Slav origin. Bardhi also complained that the Albanian language "was being lost and degenerating" under the blows of foreign occupiers, and in order to preserve it he saw himself contributing to the missing of rising the national pride between Albanians.

From 1637 on, Bardhi submitted reports in Italian and Latin to the Congregation of the Propaganda Fide in Rome which contain a mine of information about his diocese, about political developments, about Albanian customs and about the structure and position of the Catholic Church in Ottoman-occupied Albania.

See also
Bardhi family name
Pjeter Budi
Pjeter Bogdani
Gjon Buzuku

References

External links
"Description and information on the state of the bishopric and parish churches of the Diocese of Sapa, subjected to the tyranny of the Turks"
Albanian Literature, Section 1.6, by Robert Elsie, pages 24–27
Dictionarivm Latino Epiroticvm per R. D. Franciscvm Blanchvm
 (for Chronology of Bishops)
 (for Chronology of Bishops)

Frang
1606 births
1643 deaths
Republic of Venice clergy
People from Lezhë
17th-century Albanian Roman Catholic bishops
17th-century Latin-language writers
Venetian period in the history of Albania
Albanian lexicographers
17th-century Albanian historians
Sanjak of Scutari
Members of the Congregation for the Evangelization of Peoples
17th-century male writers
17th-century Roman Catholic bishops in the Ottoman Empire
Roman Catholic bishops of Sapë